The Tyrrell 017 was a Formula One racing car designed by Maurice Philippe and Brian Lisles. It was built and raced by Tyrrell Racing in the  season and also for the first race of the  season. It used a customer Cosworth DFZ V8 engine as had its predecessor. The car was driven in 1988 by British pair Jonathan Palmer and Formula One rookie Julian Bailey. Bailey was replaced by Michele Alboreto in 1989 as was the Cosworth DFZ replaced by the more powerful 1988 motor the Cosworth DFR.

The 017 was a development of the team's successful  car, the Tyrrell DG016. However, as successful as the DG016 was in the naturally aspirated part of the championship (Tyrrell won the 'Colin Chapman Cup' as the leading atmospheric constructor while Jonathan Palmer won the 'Jim Clark Cup' as the atmo Drivers' Champion), the 017 was equally unsuccessful. Bailey failed to score a point and also failed to qualify for 10 races. Palmer scored all of the team's 5 points with Tyrrell finishing 8th in the Constructors' Championship.

For 1989 the car had minor upgrades for the first race of the season and was dubbed the 017B. The car was still uncompetitive and was replaced from the second race in San Marino with the Tyrrell 018.

Complete Formula One results
(key)

* All points in  scored using the Tyrrell 018

References

Tyrrell Formula One cars